The 2015 Istria Cup was the third edition of the Istria Cup, an invitational women's football tournament held annually in Croatia. It took place from 4–11 March 2015 at the same time as the 2015 Algarve Cup and 2015 Cyprus Cup.

Venues

Group stage

Group A

Group B

Group C

Knockout stage

Eleventh place match

Ninth place match

Seventh place match

Fifth place match

Third place match

Final

Final standings

External links
Official website

Istria Cup
International association football competitions hosted by Croatia
Istria Cup
2015